Capital TV is an Urdu language Pakistani private television news channel based in Islamabad, launched on April 10, 2013.

Current Programs
 Cross Check
 Live With Aniqa
 Zaban-e-Aam With Ahsan Sheikh
 Bay Laag
 Hum Sub
 News Plus
 Seedhi Baat
 Tech Capital
 Awaam
 Capital Clinic
 Dr.toothpaste challenge

Former programming
Inkaar
Mumkin

See also
 Daily Capital
 List of television stations in Pakistan
List of news channels in Pakistan

References

2013 establishments in Pakistan
24-hour television news channels in Pakistan
Urdu-language mass media
Television channels and stations established in 2013
Television stations in Islamabad